Julien Boutter was the defending champion, but lost in the second round this year.

Santiago Ventura won the title, defeating Dominik Hrbatý 6–3, 1–6, 6–4 in the final. Notably, this was Ventura's first ATP Tour-level appearance.

Seeds

  Dominik Hrbatý (final)
  Younes El Aynaoui (withdrew)
  Antony Dupuis (quarterfinals)
  Rubén Ramírez Hidalgo (first round)
  Cyril Saulnier (second round)
  Dennis van Scheppingen (first round)
  Thierry Ascione (quarterfinals)
  Óscar Hernández (quarterfinals)

Draw

Finals

Top half

Bottom half

External links
 Association of Tennis Professionals (ATP) – 2004 Grand Prix Hassan II Men's Singles draw

Singles